Episemasia cervinaria is a species of geometrid moth in the family Geometridae first described by Alpheus Spring Packard in 1873. It is found in North America.

References

Further reading

External links

 

Caberini
Articles created by Qbugbot
Moths described in 1873